Clermont-l'Hérault is a commune in the Hérault department in southern France.

Geography

Chief town of the Canton, Clermont-l'Hérault is located about 40 km west of Montpellier, halfway between the Mediterranean Sea to the south and the Cévennes National Park to the north.

Hydrography
La Lergue, Le Salagou, Ruisseau des Servières are the main rivers that cross the town.

Climate
The city enjoys a Mediterranean climate. The winter is mild, despite occasional frosts. Summer is hot. In autumn, Mediterranean episodes occur bringing intense and heavy rainfall.

History
The site of Clermont-l'Hérault has been inhabited since Protohistory: during the Iron Age (6th century BC), Clermont constitutes one of the main Oppida of the Celtic Mediterranean.

Recent archaeological excavations have demonstrated its importance during antiquity (INRAP, 2000s). There was then a main agglomeration of five to six hectares and a peripheral inhabited area of 12 hectares. The remains of a thermal establishment have been uncovered.

The town was several times taken and retaken in the religious wars of the 16th century.
The city was formerly known as Clermont-Lodève. The manufacture of sheets was established at nearby Villeneuvette, or rather relaunched in 1667 by Colbert to develop the cloth industry in France, taking advantage of the waters of the Dourbie.

Politics and administration

Population

Sights
The town is built on the slope of a hill ("Pioch Castel") which is crowned by an ancient castle (Château des Guilhem) and skirted by the Rhonel, a tributary of the Lergue. It has a southern Gothic style chapel "Les Pénitents" (The Penitents) that has been recently restored. It is now a cultural centre. Also of interest is Saint Paul's church, begun in the 12th century, and finished in the 14th century.

Close by is the large man-made Lac du Salagou.

International relations
Clermont-l'Hérault is twinned with:
 San Gimignano
 Patchway
 Gauting

See also
Communes of the Hérault department

References

External links

General Information on the town in English

Communes of Hérault